Jonathan Page (born September 16, 1976, in Tilton, New Hampshire, USA) is an American bicycle racer specializing in cyclo-cross and road racing. He was the USA Cycling National Cyclo-cross Champion in 2002 (primary sponsor Richard Sachs), 2003 (primary sponsor Selle Italia-Guerciotti) and 2004 (primary sponsor Cervélo). Page won his fourth National Championship in 2013. He lives in Underhill, Vermont, when not based in Oudenaarde, Belgium during the cyclocross season.

Career achievements 

2002–2003
1st, USA Cycling Cyclocross National Championships
2003–2004
1st, USA Cycling Cyclocross National Championships
2004–2005
14th, UCI World Cyclo-cross Championships
1st, USA Cycling Cyclocross National Championships
2005–2006
10th, World Cyclo-cross Championships, Zeddam, The Netherlands
1st, Fitchburg Longsjo Classic
3rd, USA Cycling Cyclocross National Championships, Providence, RI
2006–2007
 2nd, UCI World Cyclo-cross Championships, Hooglede-Gits, Belgium
 2nd, USA Cycling Cyclocross National Championships, Providence, RI
 3rd, Cyclo-cross Gazet van Antwerpen (Oostmalle), Belgium
2007–2008
2nd, USA Cycling Cyclocross National Championships, Kansas City, Kansas
2011–2012
3rd, USA Cycling Cyclocross National Championships, Madison, Wisconsin
2013
1st,  USA Cycling Cyclocross National Championships, Verona, Wisconsin

References

External links
Jonathan Page (official site)

1976 births
Living people
American male cyclists
Cyclo-cross cyclists
People from Tilton, New Hampshire
American cyclo-cross champions
People from Summit County, Utah